Bryony Duus (born 7 October 1977) is an Australian soccer coach and former midfielder for the Australia women's national soccer team.

Life 
Duus grew up in Ipswich, Queensland where she played football for Coalstars and Ipswich Girls Grammar School.

Duus was part of the Queensland Academy of Sport and Australian Institute of Sport women's football programs, before going on to play in the national championships for the Queensland Sting.

She competed at the 2000 Summer Olympics and 2003 FIFA Women's World Cup.

She is the current U17 coach and Senior Women assistant coach at Western Pride FC, having been invited to the club by her former international teammate Belinda Kitching.

Having learned Italian, Duus joined the AIS European Training Centre in a logistics role after a persistent knee injury prevented her from continuing her playing career.

See also
 Australia at the 2000 Summer Olympics

References

External links
 

1977 births
Living people
Sportspeople from Ipswich, Queensland
Soccer players from Queensland
Australian women's soccer players
Place of birth missing (living people)
Footballers at the 2000 Summer Olympics
Olympic soccer players of Australia
Women's association football midfielders
2003 FIFA Women's World Cup players
Australia women's international soccer players